Dore Gold (born 1953) is an American-Israeli political scientist and diplomat who served as Permanent Representative of Israel to the United Nations from 1997 to 1999. He is currently the President of the Jerusalem Center for Public Affairs. He was also an advisor to the former Israeli Prime Minister Ariel Sharon and to Prime Minister Benjamin Netanyahu during his first term in office. In May 2015, Netanyahu named him Director-General of the Israeli Ministry of Foreign Affairs. From June 2015 until October 2016 he served as Director-General of the Israel Ministry of Foreign Affairs.

Early life
Dore Gold was born in 1953 in Hartford, Connecticut, in the United States, and was raised in a Conservative Jewish home. His primary education was spent at the Orthodox Yeshiva of Hartford. In the 1970s, Gold attended Northfield Mount Hermon School (Class of 1971) and then enrolled in Columbia University. There Gold earned BA and MA in Political Science, and then  a PhD in Political Science and Middle Eastern Studies.

He studied literary Arabic and specialized in international law, and his doctoral dissertation was about Saudi Arabia. This research later formed the foundation for his 2003 New York Times bestseller, Hatred's Kingdom: How Saudi Arabia Supports the New Global Terrorism. In the book, Gold argues that Saudi Arabia actively funds terrorism by supporting the enemies of the U.S. and attacking its allies. Today, Gold lives in Jerusalem with his wife, Ofra, and his two children, Yael and Ariel.

Career
Dore Gold's political career began in 1985 when Gold served as senior research associate at Tel Aviv University's Moshe Dayan Centre for Near East Studies. Later, he was appointed Director of the U.S. Foreign and Defense Policy Project at the Jaffee Centre for Strategic Studies at Tel Aviv University and held this position from 1985 to 1996.

Peace Negotiations
In 1991, Gold was an advisor to the Israeli delegation at the Madrid Peace Conference. From June 1996 to June 1997 he served as Foreign Policy Adviser to Israeli Prime Minister Benjamin Netanyahu. During the period in which Benjamin Netanyahu served as the head of the Israeli opposition, Gold was instrumental in forging the relationship between the Likud Party leadership and the Hashemite Kingdom of Jordan in response to the strategic ties that were growing between Israel's Labor government and the PLO under Yasser Arafat. Gold accompanied Netanyahu to meetings with the Jordanian leadership in 1994 and 1995 in London, Amman and in Aqaba. As the Foreign Policy Adviser under Netanyahu after the 1996 elections, Gold worked with the Palestinian Authority, Egypt, Jordan and others in the Arab world. He was also involved in negotiations leading up to the Hebron Agreement and the Note for the Record.

East Jerusalem and the Oslo Accords
Gold himself has not written about the period in which he served as an envoy to the Palestinians and the rest of the Arab world; nonetheless, a number of revelations have been disclosed by other authors. According to Barry Rubin and Judith Colp Rubin, Gold and Netanyahu advisor Yitzhak Molcho were the first envoys of the newly elected Likud government to meet with Yasser Arafat in the Gaza Strip on June 27, 1996. Dennis Ross relates to the "Abu-Mazen-Dore Gold" talks that ensued afterwards as a result of which the Palestinians closed down offices in East Jerusalem that Israel had argued were a violation of  the Oslo Accords. This was the price that Arafat had to pay for his first meeting with Netanyahu. It was a hard concession for the Palestinians, according to Ross, for it was viewed by them as a "symbolic retreat on East Jerusalem."

Syria and the Golan Heights
On the Syrian negotiating track, former Israeli ambassador to the US, Itamar Rabinovich, describes how he concluded with Gold an understanding over the Monitoring Group for Southern Lebanon, which was followed by a direct discussion between Gold and the Syrian ambassador to the US, Walid Muallam. According to the French journalist, Charles Enderline, Gold secured a commitment from Secretary of State Warren Christopher that the Rabin "deposit" on the future of the Golan Heights did not bind the State of Israel. This effort also included obtaining a new US commitment from the Clinton administration to the September 1975 Ford letter, in which it was stated that the US would give great weight to Israel remaining on the Golan Heights. According to the Israeli Hebrew daily, Maariv, Christopher wrote this renewed commitment in a formal letter of assurances to Prime Minister Benjamin Netanyahu on September 19, 1996.

Ambassador to the United Nations

From 1997 to 1999 Gold was the Israeli ambassador to the United Nations. In 1998 Gold served as a member of the Israeli delegation at the Wye River negotiations between Israel, the PLO, and then U.S. President Bill Clinton at the Wye River Plantation in Maryland.

President of the Jerusalem Center for Public Affairs
From 2000 to the present, Gold has been the president of the Jerusalem Center for Public Affairs. Gold has much experience in US–Israel policy. His articles and books cover a wide variety of Israeli diplomacy such as: Jerusalem, the United Nations and its implications for Israel, nuclear Iran, and the United States' relationship with Israel. One of the projects Gold has led at the JCPA is the concept of Defensible Borders for Israel.

Later life
Since 2000 Gold has served as president of the non-profit institute, Jerusalem Center for Public Affairs. From 2001 to 2003, Gold served as an adviser to Israeli Prime Minister Ariel Sharon, most notably at the Aqaba Summit with President George W. Bush. During this period, Gold regularly appeared on US network television programs on behalf of the Sharon government, including Meet the Press, The Today Show, CNN's Late Edition, as well as on Fox and Friends. In July 2003, Gold testified as an expert before the U.S. Senate Committee on Governmental Affairs on Saudi Arabia's alleged role in providing ideological and financial support for international terrorism.

Measures against Ahmadinejad
Since 2006, Gold led an international effort by the Jerusalem Center for Public Affairs to advocate that UN member states take legal measures against President Mahmoud Ahmadinejad of Iran on grounds that he violated the anti-incitement clauses of the 1948 Genocide Convention, with his repeated statements about "wiping Israel off the map." Gold led a delegation to a conference held jointly with the Conference of Presidents of Major American Jewish Organizations at the New York County Bar Association on December 14, 2006. Speakers included former Canadian Justice Minister Irwin Cotler, Prof. Alan Dershowitz of Harvard Law School, and the US ambassador to the UN John Bolton. Senator Hillary Clinton sent a letter of support to the conference.

Gold led an Israeli delegation to a second conference at the British House of Commons on January 25, 2007 which was chaired by Lord David Trimble and supported by members of the British Labour Party and the Conservative Party. Former Israeli Prime Minister Benjamin Netanyahu joined the Israeli team. As a result of this effort, over 60 members of the House of Commons called for the indictment of Ahmadinejad. A third event organized by Gold and the International Association of Genocide Scholars was held on September 23, 2008 in Washington D.C. Speaking at the third conference was Ambassador Richard Holbrooke, former US ambassador to the UN, as well as Salih Mahmoud Osman, a member of the Sudanese Parliament and advocate for human rights in Darfur.

The Doha Debates
In April 2009, Gold participated in the Doha Debates at Georgetown University in Washington, D.C., where he debated against the motion "this house believes that it is time for the USA to get tough on Israel" with fellow speaker Harvard Law Professor Alan Dershowitz. Speakers for the motion were Avraham Burg, former Chairman of the Jewish Agency for Israel and former Speaker of the Knesset and Michael Scheuer, former Chief of the CIA Bin Laden Issue Station. Gold and Dershowitz lost the debate, with 63% of the audience voting for the motion.

Appearing at the International Criminal Court in the Hague
Ambassador Gold was invited to attend a roundtable meeting at the office of the Prosecutor of the International Criminal Court in the Hague, held on October 20, 2010. A total of eight specialists appeared and submitted papers. They discussed the Palestinian Authority's declaration on January 22, 2009 recognizing the jurisdiction of the ICC, in accordance with an article in the Rome Statute, normally reserved for states. The PA was seeking the implicit recognition of the ICC Prosecutor that it already was a state.

Re-joining Netanyahu
In December 2013, it was announced that Gold would once again advise Benjamin Netanyahu. His purview will not include negotiations with the Palestinians, but will cover Israel's relations with the U.S. and United Nations, as well as Iran policy.

Director-General of the Foreign Ministry
On May 25, 2015, Prime Minister Benjamin Netanyahu, who was also serving as Minister of Foreign Affairs, announced Gold's appointment as Director-General of the Ministry of Foreign Affairs, subject to the cabinet's approval. On October 13, 2016, Gold resigned from the Director-General's position for personal reasons.

Positions held
1985–1996 – Senior research associate, Dayan Centre for Near East Studies. Director, US Foreign and Defense Policy Project at the Jaffee Centre for Strategic Studies at Tel Aviv University.
1991 – Advisor, Madrid Peace Conference.
1996–1997 – Foreign policy advisor, Israeli Prime Minister Benjamin Netanyahu
1997–1999 – Israeli ambassador, United Nations
1998 – Israeli delegation, Wye River negotiations
2000–Present – President, Jerusalem Center for Public Affairs
2002–2004 – Advisor, Israeli Prime Minister Ariel Sharon

Awards & honors
In 2020, Gold received the Bonei Zion Prize in the field of Global Impact.

Publications

Books
 The Rise of Nuclear Iran: How Tehran Defies the West (Regnery, 2009). 
 The Fight for Jerusalem:  Radical Islam, the West, and the Future of the Holy City ( / Publisher: Regnery, Blackstone Audiobooks / Date: Jan 2007)
 Tower of Babble: How the United Nations Has Fueled Global Chaos (Crown Forum, November, 2004).  
 Hatred's Kingdom: How Saudi Arabia Supports the New Global Terrorism (Regnery, 2003). 
 American Military Strategy in the Middle East: The Implications of the US Regional Command Structure (CENTCOM) For Israel (Tel Aviv: Ministry of Defense Publications), 1993.
 Israel as an American Non-NATO Ally: Parameters of Defense and Industrial Cooperation (Boulder: Westview Press), 1992.

Selected articles
The Political Battle Over the 'Occupation'. The Weekly Standard. July 20, 2012.
'Land Swaps' and the 1967 Lines. The Weekly Standard. June 20, 2011.
Israel's 1967 Borders Aren't Defensible. The Wall Street Journal. May 21, 2011.
 Countdown to September. Jerusalem Viewpoints. May, 2011.
Foreign Policy. April, 2011.
Statement before the Foreign Affairs Committee of the U.S. House of Representatives . April 5, 2011.
The International Context of the U.S. Veto at the UN Security Council . Makor Rishon. February 25, 2011.
Israel’s Naval Blockade of Gaza Is Legal, Necessary . Bloomberg. June 10, 2010.
Iran's Nuclear Aspirations Threaten the World. LA Times. August 6, 2009.
Israel's Forgotten Rights in Jerusalem. Haaretz. May, 2009.
Did Israel use "Disproportionate Force" in Gaza?. JCPA. December 28, 2008.
The Dangers of 'Peace' Making: America's Latest Efforts Merely Entrenched al Qaeda in the Gaza Strip. Wall Street Journal. August 12, 2007.
Saudi Arabia's Dubious Denials of Involvement in International Terrorism. Jerusalem Viewpoints. Oct 1, 2003.
Saudi Support for International Terrorism. U.S. Senate Committee on Governmental Affairs.  July 31, 2003.
The Kingdom of Incitement. Wall Street Journal.  April 14, 2003.
Baseless Comparisons: UN Security Council Resolutions on Iraq and Israel (Jerusalem Issue Brief, 24 September 2002).
Only Buffer Zones Can Protect Israel. The New York Times. Feb 27, 2002.

References

External links

Biography of Dore Gold from the Jerusalem Center for Public Affairs
JCPA publications by Dore Gold
Biography of Dore Gold from the Jewish Virtual Library
Moshe Dayan Center for Middle Eastern and African Studies
Dore Gold interviewed for the Jerusalem Post
 by Leon Charney on The Leon Charney Report
'Only a blind person would ignore the gravity of the threat which is emerging': an interview with Dore Gold - Fathom Journal

1953 births
American Conservative Jews
American emigrants to Israel
American political scientists
American Zionists
Bonei Zion Prize recipients
Columbia Graduate School of Arts and Sciences alumni
Columbia College (New York) alumni
Israeli Conservative Jews
Israeli diplomats
Israeli political scientists
Jewish American politicians
Living people
Northfield Mount Hermon School alumni
People from Hartford, Connecticut
21st-century American Jews
Diplomats from Jerusalem